Anglards-de-Saint-Flour (Auvergnat: Anglars de Sant Flor) is a commune in the Cantal department in the Auvergne region in south-central France.

Population

See also
Communes of the Cantal department

References

Communes of Cantal